Picture Cave is a cave in Warren County, Missouri containing a large array of Native American wall paintings, from which it takes its name. It has been described as “the most important rock art site in North America.” A total of 296 prehistoric glyphs are present on the cave walls.
In 2021 the cave was sold to an undisclosed buyer for over 2 million dollars despite the objections of the Osage Nation.

References

Further reading

Caves of Missouri
Landforms of Warren County, Missouri
Limestone caves